In High Definition, also known as Ultra-Octa-Doom, is the first live album and 16th album overall by rapper Kool Keith.  The album was released on May 29, 2007, for 2B1 Records and was produced by Kool Keith, Kutmasta Kurt and DJ Bootleg.  A DVD of Keith's concert performances was included with the album.

Track listing
"Heads Up"- 3:21 
"Funky" (High DeFinition)- 2:22 
"Ease Back"- 2:06 
"Ego Trippin'- 1:28 
"Two Brothers With Checks"- 1:37 
"Party"- 1:08 
"Check It Out S.F."- 5:34 
"Blue Flowers"- 2:53 
"Blue Flowers" (Remix)- 2:25 
"Girl Let Me Touch You"- 3:31 
"Freaks"- 2:22 
"Spankmaster"- 1:14 
"Living Astro"- 1:53 
"G-Spot"- 3:34 
"Sex Style"- 3:25 
"Pick 'Em Up"- 2:56 
"I Don't Believe You"- 1:32 
"No Chorus"- 2:38 
"Freestylin'"- 5:08 
"Poppa Large"- 4:10

Kool Keith albums
2007 live albums